Batang Melaka railway station is a Malaysian train station named after the town of Batang Melaka, Jasin, Malacca. It is one of the only two stations, the other being Pulau Sebang/Tampin station, to serve the state of Malacca.

A new station was constructed as part of the Seremban–Gemas Electrified Double Tracking Project and began operations on 7 February 2014, replacing an old station which closed in May 2012 and subsequently abandoned.

The station was a stop for the KTM Intercity's Ekspres Selatan services from 2015 to 2021.

See also
 Keretapi Tanah Melayu
 Pulau Sebang/Tampin railway station

References

Jasin District
KTM ETS railway stations
Railway stations in Melaka